The VIVA Film Festival is an annual documentary and short film festival that is based in Sarajevo and in 19 cities in Bosnia and Herzegovina. The festival showcases international films with ecological,natural hereligious,touristic themes, as well as youth-made films. It was established by an international team of film professionals, environmentalists, diplomats, religious leaders and scholars that includes former US Vice President Al Gore (current festival Vice Chairman), Bosnian archeologist Semir Osmanagić and others, with the purpose of promoting inter-religious dialogue, the preservation of the environment and ecotourism.

Format

The festival is composed of five competition programs: Grand Prix, Ecology, Religion, Tourism and Youth-directed. It is based in Sarajevo, where the centre piece events, projections and award ceremonies are held, but also travels to cities and towns across Bosnia and Herzegovina. Each town has its own management departement and they are all interlinked. Heads of the various management departements sit in the festival's managing council. Each year's competition selection includes more than 100 films from over 45 countries that tackle the issues of inter-religious dialogue, environmentalism and ecotourism. A panel of filmmakers, religious and community leaders, writers and human rights advocates judges the entries, based both on their cinematic value and on their message, deciding on the three best films from each program.

Award winners

Grand Prix

Ecology

Religion

Tourism

Youth

References

External links
 Official website

Film festivals established in 2015
September events
Tourist attractions in Sarajevo
Annual events in Bosnia and Herzegovina
Documentary film festivals in Bosnia and Herzegovina
Film festivals in Sarajevo
2015 establishments in Bosnia and Herzegovina